Limbatochlamys is a genus of moths in the family Geometridae described by Rothschild in 1894.

Species
Limbatochlamys rosthorni Rothschild, 1894
Limbatochlamys pararosthorni Han & Xue, 2005
Limbatochlamys parvisis Han & Xue, 2005

References

External links

Pseudoterpnini